Theodor Altermann (24 November 1885 – 1 April 1915) was an actor, theatre director and producer in the Russian Empire.

His father was Jüri Altermann, his mother was Miina Nurm.

Sources
 Bernhard Linde, "Theodor Altermann" – Looming 1925, nr. 4, pp. 325–330
 "Theodor Altermann". Mälestusteos, autorid: Ants Lauter, Bernhard Linde, Paul Pinna, Albert Org, Hugo Raudsepp, Erna Villmer, Albert Üksip. Näitekunsti Sihtkapitali Valitsus, Tallinn 1940, 67 pp.
 Hugo Viires, "Theodor Altermann" – Looming 1940, nr. 9, pp. 1002–04
 Paul Pinna, "Theodor Altermann" – Looming 1945, nr. 11, pp. 1145–58
 Lilian Kirepe, "Theodor Altermann. Ülevaade elust ja tegevusest". Teatriteed series, "Eesti Raamat", Tallinn 1968, 77 pp.
 "Theodor Altermann – 100" – "Teater. Muusika. Kino" 1985, nr. 11, pp. 55–65
 , pp 169–171.

External links
 Theodor Altermanni palanguline aeg, Kultuur ja Elu 2005, nr. 4 
 Maaomanik ei salli mälestuskivi, Maaleht, 8 July 2008 (article by Viio Aitsam about threat to Altermann's memorial) 
 ISIK Estonian Biographical database: Theodor Altermann 
 TMM.ee: Photographs

1885 births
1915 deaths
People from Kohila Parish
People from Kreis Harrien
Male actors from the Russian Empire
Theatre directors from the Russian Empire